Faustina is a 1995 Polish biographical drama film about Faustina Kowalska, a Roman Catholic nun and mystic whose apparitions of Jesus Christ inspired the Catholic devotion to the Divine Mercy. Directed by Jerzy Łukaszewicz, it stars Dorota Segda as the titular nun.

Cast
Dorota Segda as Sister Faustyna (Helena) Kowalska
Mirosława Dubrawska as General Mother of the congregation
Krzysztof Wakuliński as Priest Michał Sopoćko
Teresa Budzisz-Krzyżanowska as Superior Mother of Monastery
Zofia Rysiówna as Siostra Wiktoryna
Janusz Michałowski as Malarz Eugeniusz Kazimierowski
Agnieszka Czekańska as Sister Feliksa
Renata Berger as Psychiatrist

See also
Divine Mercy: No Escape, a 1987 American film which also depicts the life of Faustina Kowalska

References

External links

1995 films
1990s biographical drama films
Cultural depictions of Polish women
Films about Catholic nuns
1990s Polish-language films
Polish biographical drama films